Mohd Muhaimin Omar (born on 17 March 1989), is a Malaysian footballer. He currently plays for Malaysia Super League side Terengganu FA.

He had been called up by Malaysia's coach, K.Rajagobal for international friendly match against Yemen, and he made his debut for Malaysia in this match.

References

1989 births
Living people
Malaysia international footballers
Terengganu FC players
Malaysian footballers
People from Terengganu
Association football defenders